The 2015–16 season was Nottingham Forest's 150th season in existence and 8th consecutive season in the Championship since promotion in 2007–08. The club also participated in the FA Cup and the Football League Cup. On the 13 March 2016, manager Dougie Freedman was sacked after Forest lost five of his final six games in charge. Freedman was replaced by first team coach Paul Williams, who was appointed for the remainder of the season. The season covers the period from 1 July 2015 to 30 June 2016.

First team squad

New contracts

Player transfers

Transfers in

Loans in

Transfers out

Loans out

Pre-season friendlies
On 3 June 2015 Nottingham Forest confirmed their pre-season friendlies and plans for a tour of Sweden.

Competitions

Championship

League table

Results summary

Results by matchday

Matches
On 17 June 2015, the fixtures for the forthcoming season were announced.

FA Cup

Football League Cup

Squad statistics

Appearances and goals

|}

Source: Nottingham Forest F.C.

Goal scorers

Source: Nottingham Forest F.C.

Disciplinary record

Source: Nottingham Forest F.C.

References

Nottingham Forest
Nottingham Forest F.C. seasons